Austinburg Township is one of the twenty-seven townships of Ashtabula County, Ohio, United States. The 2010 census found 2,197 people in the township.

Geography
Located in the northwestern part of the county, it borders the following townships:
Saybrook Township - north
Plymouth Township - northeast corner
Jefferson Township - east
Lenox Township - southeast corner
Morgan Township - south
Trumbull Township - southwest corner
Harpersfield Township - west
Geneva Township - northwest corner

No municipalities are located in Austinburg Township, although the unincorporated community of Austinburg lies in the township's north.

Name and history
It is the only Austinburg Township statewide.

The township was first settled by several people from Connecticut, who arrived in 1799. During the Civil War, the township was a location on the Underground Railroad.

Government
The township is governed by a three-member board of trustees, who are elected in November of odd-numbered years to a four-year term beginning on the following January 1. Two are elected in the year after the presidential election and one is elected in the year before it. There is also an elected township fiscal officer, who serves a four-year term beginning on April 1 of the year after the election, which is held in November of the year before the presidential election. Vacancies in the fiscal officership or on the board of trustees are filled by the remaining trustees.

References

External links
Township website
County website

Townships in Ashtabula County, Ohio
Populated places on the Underground Railroad
Townships in Ohio